The Emirate of Diriyah, also known as the First Saudi State, was established in February 1727 (1139 AH). In 1744, the emir of Najdi town called Diriyah Muhammad bin Saud and the religious leader Muhammad ibn Abd al-Wahhab formed an alliance to found a socio-religious reform movement to unify the many states of the Arabian Peninsula.

Early establishment
The House of Saud and its allies quickly rose to become the dominant power in Arabia by first conquering Najd, and then expanding their influence over the eastern coast from Kuwait down to the northern borders of Oman. Furthermore, Saud's forces brought the highlands of 'Asir under their suzerainty, while Muhammad ibn Abd Al Wahhab wrote letters to people and scholars to enter the field of jihad. After many military campaigns, Muhammad bin Saud died in 1765, leaving the leadership to his son, Abdul-Aziz bin Muhammad. Saud's forces went so far as to gain command of the Shi'a holy city of Karbala in 1801. Here they destroyed the shrine of the saints and monuments and killed over 5000 civilians. In retribution, Abdulaziz was assassinated by a young Shia in 1803, having followed him back to Najd.

Muhammad bin Abd Al Wahhab died in 1792. In 1803, eleven years after his death, the son of Abdulaziz bin Muhammad, Saud bin Abdul-Aziz bin Muhammad bin Saud, sent out forces to bring the region of Hejaz under his rule. Ta'if was the first city to be captured, and later the two holy cities of Mecca and Medina. This was seen as a major challenge to the authority of the Ottoman Empire, which had exercised its rule over the holy cities since 1517.

Decline of sovereignty
The task of weakening the grip of the House of Saud was given to the powerful viceroy of Egypt, Muhammad Ali Pasha, by the Ottomans. This initiated the Ottoman–Saudi War, in which Muhammad Ali sent his troops to the Hejaz region by sea. His son, Ibrahim Pasha, then led Ottoman forces into the heart of Nejd, capturing town after town. Saud's successor, his son Abdullah bin Saud, was unable to prevent the recapture of the region. Finally, Ibrahim reached the Saudi capital at Diriyah and placed it under siege for several months until it surrendered in the winter of 1818. Ibrahim then shipped off many members of the clans of Al Saud to Egypt and the Ottoman capital, Istanbul. Abdullah bin Saud was later executed in the Ottoman capital Istanbul with his severed head later thrown into the waters of the Bosphorus, marking the end of what was known as the First Saudi State. However, both the Wahhabi sect and the remaining members of the Al Saud clan stayed committed. They founded a Second Saudi State that lasted until 1891, and later a third state, Saudi Arabia, which the Al Saud continue to rule up to the present day.

List of rulers

 Emir Muhammad bin Saud 1727–1765 (1139–1179 H)
 Emir Abdulaziz bin Muhammad 1765–1803 (1179–1218 H)
 Emir Saud bin Abdulaziz 1803–1814 (1218–1229 H)
 Emir Abdullah bin Saud 1814–1818 (1229–1233 H)

See also
List of Sunni Muslim dynasties

References

Further reading
 

18th-century establishments in the Arabian Peninsula
19th century in Saudi Arabia
1744 establishments in Asia
1818 disestablishments in Asia

Anti-Ottomanism
Former Arab states
Former countries in Western Asia
Former countries in the Middle East
Former emirates
Former monarchies of Western Asia
History of Hejaz
History of Nejd
History of Oman
History of Saudi Arabia
History of the United Arab Emirates
House of Saud
Ottoman Arabia
States and territories established in 1744
States and territories disestablished in 1818

de:Saudi-Arabien#Geschichte